Rahman Rahim oglu Hajiyev (born 25 July 1993) is an Azerbaijani professional footballer who plays as a midfielder for Keşla, on loan from Neftchi Baku, in the Azerbaijan Premier League.

Career

Club
On 8 July 2020, Keşla FK announced the signing of Hajiyev on one-year long loan.

International
On 17 November 2015 Hajiyev made his senior international debut for Azerbaijan game against Moldova.

Career statistics

International

Statistics accurate as of match played 9 June 2018

Honours

Club
Baku
 Azerbaijan Premier League
 Winner (1): 2008–09
 Azerbaijan Cup
 Winner (2): 2009–10, 2011–12

References

External links
 

1993 births
Living people
Azerbaijani footballers
Azerbaijan youth international footballers
Azerbaijan under-21 international footballers
Azerbaijan international footballers
Azerbaijani expatriate footballers
Expatriate footballers in Turkey
Azerbaijani expatriate sportspeople in Turkey
Association football midfielders
FC Baku players
Gaziantep F.K. footballers
Azerbaijan Premier League players
TFF First League players
Neftçi PFK players
Shamakhi FK players